Juan Guillermo Galindrez Mosquera (born 4 July 1994) is a Colombian professional footballer who plays as a forward for Rio Grande Valley FC in the USL Championship.

Career
Galindrez began his career in Mexico with Real Cuautitlán, where he only played 4 games due to visa issues. He then moved to Club Tijuana, spending time with Tijuana Premier where he scored 21 goals in just 34 games. His final spell in Mexico was with Dorados de Sinaloa, where he was coached by Diego Maradona.

In 2019, Galindrez returned to Colombia with second-tier side Fortaleza CEIF.

On 22 February 2021, Galindrez signed with USL League One side Chattanooga Red Wolves. He made his debut for the club on 8 May 2021, starting in a 1–0 win over North Texas SC. He finished 2021 with 11 goals, tied for 5th in the league.

On 13 July 2022, Galindrez was named USL League One player of the month for June after scoring 6 goals throughout the month. He would finish the 2022 season with the 4th most goals in the league at 14.

On 25 January 2023, it was announced that Galindrez has signed with USL Championship side Rio Grande Valley FC.

References

External links
 Profile at Chattanooga Red Wolves

1994 births
Living people
Colombian footballers
Colombian expatriate footballers
Colombian expatriate sportspeople in Mexico
Colombian expatriate sportspeople in the United States
Association football forwards
Real Cuautitlán footballers
Club Tijuana footballers
Dorados de Sinaloa footballers
Fortaleza C.E.I.F. footballers
Chattanooga Red Wolves SC players
Rio Grande Valley FC Toros players
USL League One players
Footballers from Cali
Expatriate footballers in Mexico
Expatriate soccer players in the United States